Maratelli is a semifino rice native to the Asigliano Vercellese province of Vercelli in northern Italy. It is a stable rice genotype that maintains its features. In 1970 it covered 8% of Italian rice-cultivated fields. Maratelli rice keeps its shape better than other forms of rice during the slow cooking required for making risotto due to higher quantities of amylose.

History
Maratelli rice was "born" at Asigliano V.se (Vercelli) in the autumn of 1914 when the rice farmer Mario Maratelli saw a rice plant in the field which was different from all the other plants of the Chinese originario he was growing in that field. The plant has longer panicles, is droopier, and has a larger number of grains. The panicles are yellow, which is typical of full ripening and therefore near to harvesting. These panicles are different from the other panicles in the fields in that they have matured early whereas the others are hardly yellow and not mature.
Maratelli picked these already mature panicles, isolated them, and packed them to preserve them with the intention of sowing these "different" kernels the following year. The next year he sowed the few kernels on an isolated plot of land and closely followed all the biological phases of the plants which germinate from them. He takes note of the tiller index of the mother plants and also, above all, the early ripening in comparison to the other cultivars grown. He receives confirmation of the differences he had observed the previous year and all the panicles present underlined these differences when they matured. Maratelli noted the vegetative development of the plants and compares these characteristics with those of plants from other varieties underlining certain positive aspects, these are: early maturing, better yield, better use of the land. The grains of white rice are tried in the kitchen to prepare classic dishes (such as risotto, panissa, and rice in broth) and once again the new rice finds wide approval in as much as it doesn't overcook, it combines well with other ingredients and satisfies the housewives. The new variety spreads rapidly in the Vercellese lowland and in a few years takes over from the other established varieties and imposes and maintains the record for a long time. An important step has been taken to recoup and enhance the rice "invented" by Mario Maratelli in 1914. From the end of April 2013, the original Maratelli has been inserted in the National Register of Historic Varieties.

Botanical and agronomic traits
Maratelli is an historical variety of Italian rice production, developed in 1919 through the selection of Chinese originario by Mario Maratelli from Asigliano. Maratelli is a semi-early variety (15 days earlier than Chinese originario) which shows a medium height, "semifino", awnless pearl grain. Maratelli shows a high seedling vegetative vigor, quite a good tiller index (seven fertile stems/plant), good cold tolerance at germination stage, and medium cold tolerance at flowering stage. Stem has average height of 90–110 cm, strong and resistant to lodging. Leaf is light green colour.
 Panicle: open, semi droopy attitude.
 Average length 20 cm, with 90–110 kernels per panicle.
 Spikelet: yellow colour, pigmented point and awnless.
 Spikelet biometric data: 7.8 mm length and 3.7 mm width.
 1000-kernel weight is 32.2 grams
 Kernels: white pericarp, pearl endosperm (lateral pearl and irregular shape).
 Kernel biometric data: 5.6 mm length and 3.2 mm width.
 1000-kernel weight is 24.1 grams

References

Rice varieties